Otto Schulmeister (1 April 1916 in Vienna - 10 August 2001 in Vienna) was an Austrian journalist, who was described as the doyen of Austrian journalism. He was editor-in-chief of Die Presse from 1961 to 1976 and its publisher from 1976 to 1989. He was the father of former ORF correspondent Paul Schulmeister, and economist Stephan Schulmeister. Formerly a NSDAP member, it was revealed in 2009 that he worked for the CIA from the 1960s.

Awards 
 1979: Preis der Stadt Wien für Publizistik
 1989: Hanns Martin Schleyer Prize

Works 
 Die Zukunft Österreichs, 1967
 Die Welt, die wir verlassen, 1970
 Die erschöpfte Revolution, 1978
 Der zweite Anschluß, 1979
 Ernstfall Österreich, 1995

Literature

References

External links 
 
 

1916 births
2001 deaths
20th-century Austrian journalists
Journalists from Vienna
Nazi Party members
Die Presse editors